Jerma may refer to:

 Jerma (river), a river of Serbia and Bulgaria
 Jerma people, an ethnic group of Niger and neighbouring countries
 Jerma language, a language of West Africa
 Jerma (Libya), an archaeological site in Libya
 Jerma985, American livestreamer and voice actor
 Jerma Palace Hotel, an abandoned hotel in Malta

See also 
 Yerma (disambiguation)
 Germa (disambiguation)
 Djerma (disambiguation)
 Jarma (disambiguation)